This is a list of diplomatic missions of Greece, excluding honorary consulates. Greece has an extensive global diplomatic presence.

Current missions

Africa

Americas

Asia

Europe

Oceania

Multilateral organizations

Gallery

Closed missions

Africa

Americas

Asia

Europe

Oceania

See also

Foreign relations of Greece
List of diplomatic missions in Greece
Visa policy of the Schengen Area

Notes

References

External links

Greek Ministry of Foreign Affairs

 
Diplomatic missions
Greece